Succinyl-CoA ligase [GDP-forming] subunit beta, mitochondrial is an enzyme that in humans is encoded by the SUCLG2 gene on chromosome 3.

This gene encodes a GTP-specific beta subunit of succinyl-CoA synthetase. Succinyl-CoA synthetase catalyzes the reversible reaction involving the formation of succinyl-CoA and succinate. Alternate splicing results in multiple transcript variants. Pseudogenes of this gene are found on chromosomes 5 and 12. [provided by RefSeq, Apr 2010]

Structure 
SCS, also known as succinyl CoA ligase (SUCL), is a heterodimer composed of a catalytic α subunit encoded by the SUCLG1 gene and a β subunit encoded by either the SUCLA2 gene or the SUCLG2 gene, which determines the enzyme specificity for either ADP or GDP. SUCLG2 is the SCS variant containing the SUCLG2-encoded β subunit. Amino acid sequence alignment of the two β subunit types reveals a homology of ~50% identity, with specific regions conserved throughout the sequences.

SUCLG2 is located on chromosome 3 and contains 14 exons.

Function 
As a subunit of SCS, SUCLG2 is a mitochondrial matrix enzyme that catalyzes the reversible conversion of succinyl-CoA to succinate and acetoacetyl CoA, accompanied by the substrate-level phosphorylation of GDP to GTP, as a step in the tricarboxylic acid (TCA) cycle. The GTP generated is then consumed in anabolic pathways. However, since GTP is not transported through the inner mitochondrial membrane in mammals and other higher organisms, it must be recycled within the matrix. In addition, SUCLG2 may function in ATP generation in the absence of SUCLA2 by complexing with the mitochondrial nucleotide diphosphate kinase, nm23-H4, and thus compensate for SUCLA2 deficiency. The reverse reaction generates succinyl-CoA from succinate to fuel ketone body and heme synthesis.

While SCS is ubiquitously expressed, SUCLG2 is predominantly expressed in tissues involved in biosynthesis, including liver and kidney. SUCLG2 has also been detected in the microvasculature of the brain, likely to support its growth. Notably, both SUCLA2 and SUCLG2 are absent in astrocytes, microglia, and oligodendrocytes in the brain; thus, in order to acquire succinate to continue the TCA cycle, these cells may instead synthesize succinate through GABA metabolism of α-ketoglutarate or ketone body metabolism of succinyl-CoA.

Clinical significance 
Though mitochondrial DNA (mtDNA) depletion syndrome has been largely attributed to SUCLA2 deficiency, SUCLG2 may play a more crucial role in mtDNA maintenance, as it functions to compensate for SUCLA2 deficiency and its absence results in decreased mtDNA and OXPHOS-dependent growth. Moreover, no mutations in the SUCLG2 gene have been reported, indicating that such mutations are lethal and selected against.

SUCLG2 may also play a role in clearing cerebrospinal fluid amyloid-beta 1–42 (Aβ1–42) in Alzheimer's disease (AD) and, thus, reducing neuronal death.

See also 
Succinyl-CoA synthetase
SUCLG1
SUCLA2

References